Paresh Chandra Adhikary is an Indian politician from AITC(till August 2022). In May 2021, he was elected as the member of the West Bengal Legislative Assembly from Mekliganj.

Career
Adhikary hails from Mekliganj, Cooch Behar district. His father's name is Dutta Narayan Adhikary. He passed Higher Secondary Examination from Mekhliganj High School, West Bengal Board of Secondary Education in 1970. Paresh Chandra Adhikary became MLA for the first time in 1991 after winning the Forward Bloc ticket. Although he lost the 1996 assembly elections, he continued to win for the Forward Bloc in 2001, 2006 and 2011. He was the Acting Food Minister of the Left Front Government in West Bengal from 2006 to 2011. In 2019, he left the Forward Bloc and joined the Trinamool Congress. In the 2019 Lok Sabha elections, he contested from Cooch Behar Lok Sabha on Trinamul Congress ticket. But Adhikary lost to BJP candidate Nisith Pramanik. In the 2021 assembly elections, he won the Mekhliganj assembly seat again and became the MLA and Chief Minister Mamata Banerjee made Paresh Chandra Adhikary the state minister for Department of School Education in the State.

Controversy
On 17 May 2022, Justice Abhijit Gangopadhyay directed CBI to interrogate Adhikary for alleged appointment of his daughter Ankita Adhikary as a teacher in government aided school. The Court also urged Chief Minister and Governor Jagdeep Dhankhar to remove Adhikary from the post of Minister.

References

Living people
Year of birth missing (living people)
21st-century Indian politicians
People from Cooch Behar district
Trinamool Congress politicians from West Bengal
Trinamool Congress politicians
West Bengal MLAs 2021–2026